The 2021–22 Slovenian Basketball League, also known as Liga Nova KBM due to sponsorship reasons, was the 31st season of the Premier A Slovenian Basketball League.

Format

Regular season 
In the first phase, ten teams compete in a home-and-away round-robin series (18 games total). Teams advanced from the regular season to one of two postseason stages, depending on their league position.

Second phase 
The top five teams from the regular season advanced to the championship phase. Cedevita Olimpija start their competition from this phase. These teams start the second phase from scratch, with no results carrying over from the regular season. Each team plays a total of 10 games in this phase; as in the regular season, a home-and-away round-robin is used.

The last five teams enter a home-and-away round-robin playout-league where two best teams qualify to quarterfinals.

Playoffs 
Eight teams join the playoffs.

Teams 
Nutrispoint Ilirija was promoted.

Venues and locations

Regular season

League table

References

Slovenian Basketball League seasons